Martin Weis (born 25 December 1970) is a German former rower. He competed at the 1996 Summer Olympics and the 2000 Summer Olympics.

References

External links
 

1970 births
Living people
German male rowers
Olympic rowers of Germany
Rowers at the 1996 Summer Olympics
Rowers at the 2000 Summer Olympics
People from Aschaffenburg
Sportspeople from Lower Franconia